= Lauraville, Virginia =

Unincorporated community in Virginia, United States

Coordinates: 37°57′37″N 77°11′43″W

Lauraville is an unincorporated community in Caroline County, in the U.S. state of Virginia.
